Bedri Ryustemov (born 17 November 1995) is a Bulgarian footballer who plays as a midfielder.

Career

Yourth career
Born in Veliko Tarnovo, Ryustemov began his career at the local clubs Etar and Etar 1924. He later moved to Bali Debelets, before moving to Malta and joining Pieta Hotspurs. 5 years later he joined Lazio Academy and was loaned to Città di Marino.

In 2013, he joined another Italian team - Novara. А year later he signed with Pro Patria.

In 2015, he moved to Spain, joining Lleida Esportiu and was later sent on loan to Llosetense. In September 2016 he signed with the Spanish team Atlético Saguntino, receiving the number 15 shirt.

Lokomotiv Gorna Oryahovitsa 
On 17 February 2017 Ryustemov returned to Bulgaria to join Lokomotiv GO. He made his debut in the First League for Lokomotiv on 2 April 2017 in a 5–0 win against Vereya, coming on as a substitute in the 86th minute.

Vereya 
On 2 October he signed a contract with the Bulgarian First League team Vereyajoining as a free agent.

International career

Youth levels
Ryustemov was called up for Bulgaria U21 on 31 May 2016 for the friendly matches against Cyprus U21 and Norway U21. He played in both matches.

Career statistics

Club

References

External links
 

Living people
1995 births
Bulgarian footballers
Association football midfielders
CD Llosetense players
Lleida Esportiu footballers
FC Lokomotiv Gorna Oryahovitsa players
FC Vereya players
First Professional Football League (Bulgaria) players
Atlético Saguntino players
People from Veliko Tarnovo
Sportspeople from Veliko Tarnovo Province